Badge Époque Ensemble is a Canadian musical project led by Max Turnbull. They are most noted for their self-titled debut album, which was a longlisted nominee for the 2020 Polaris Music Prize.

In addition to Turnbull, the band includes guitarist Chris Bezant, saxophonist Karen Ng, flautist Alia O'Brien, bassist Giosuè Rosati, percussionist Ed Squires and drummer Jay Anderson, and performs both instrumental music and songs with guest vocalists such as Jennifer Castle, Dorothea Paas, James Baley and Meg Remy. Their music blends jazz, progressive rock, psychedelic rock and funk elements.

Their self-titled debut album was released in 2019. They followed up in 2020 with Self-Help.

References

Canadian progressive rock groups
Canadian psychedelic rock music groups
Canadian funk musical groups
Canadian jazz ensembles
Jazz fusion ensembles
Musical groups from Toronto